St. Stanislaus Roman Catholic Oratory is a Roman Catholic parish in the historic Mitchell Street District of Milwaukee, Wisconsin. It was designed by Polish nobleman Leonard Kowalski, one of Milwaukee's early Polish residents, who took the name Leonard Schmidtner and spoke German.

One of Milwaukee's 'Polish Cathedrals', the parish was founded in 1866 by immigrant Poles in the Archdiocese of Milwaukee. St. Stanislaus parish was the third Roman Catholic Polish church in the United States and the first based in an urban area.

Members started with an old frame building which was purchased in 1866 from nearby St. Stephen Lutheran Church for a sum of $4,500. The twin towered building seen today was completed in 1873 with a parochial school to follow in 1889.

Today, the church is the home of the Milwaukee Latin Mass community.  The church was erected as an oratory of the Institute of Christ the King Sovereign Priest, an order of priests dedicated to the celebration of the Traditional Latin Mass.

The church has been fully restored inside and out in recent years. Renovations include restored sanctuary and sacred art, recreated stained glass windows, new copper roofing; among other functional and aesthetic improvements and restorative work.

Dedication

St. Stanislaus Catholic Church was dedicated to Stanislaus of Szczepanów, Polish martyr and saint of the Roman Catholic Church.

History

A shift of economy in the 1880s from commerce to industry brought about a rapid influx of Eastern European Catholics to the region. St. Stanislaus and the surrounding neighborhood quickly grew to become the center of Polish life in Milwaukee. Mitchell Street was often referred to as the "Polish Grand Avenue," reflecting its importance and distinction from the German dominated Grand Avenue (now Wisconsin Avenue), a popular downtown merchant street. From 1876 to 1883, the parish was served by Pastor Hyacinth (Jacek) Gulski

On May 1, 1886 about 2,000 Polish workers gathered at St. Stanislaus to organize and protest the 10-hour work day. Factories closed down as they marched through the city adding to their numbers, until sixteen thousand strong. The Bay View Tragedy later followed when State Militia confronted protesters who had camped out at the rolling mill in Bay View.

The church started a number of other Polish-speaking congregations in the East Side and Jones Island neighborhoods. By 1903, Milwaukee held the largest number of Catholics found in any city, and helped to establish a presence in other growing industrial towns that were part of the Archdiocese of Milwaukee.

January 14, 1914 was the focal point of the celebration of Father Edward Kozlowski being named as Milwaukee's first Polish bishop. He was only the second Polish-speaking Bishop in America, following the appointment of Bishop Paul Peter Rhode in Chicago in 1908. A parade was organized from St. John’s Cathedral, where Father Kozlowski had been consecrated, to Saint Stanislaus in a carriage pulled by four horses. Passing along Milwaukee’s streets, which had been lit with torches, an estimated 50,000 gathered at the church to witness Bishop Kozlowski's assumption of the bishop's mitre.  Crowds gathered once again at the church a year later after Bishop Kozlowski fell ill from blood poisoning and died on August 7, 1915; 30,000 mourners attended the funeral. Bishop Paul Rhode famously declared at the memorial service: “How difficult it was for us to obtain a second Polish bishop, and how easy to lose him.”

In 1926 the school was expanded and given a new facade. The original copper sheet domes of the church were replaced with 23 carat gold leaf in 1966, and all of the stained glass windows were removed. A mural featuring the iconic Our Lady of Czestochowa was also added to the Mitchell Street side.

As the city's Polish-American population slowly followed the urban sprawl that began in the 1950s, they were replaced by other ethnic groups. St. Stanislaus continues to serve the local community, now mostly Hispanic, by offering bilingual confession and Sunday services in Spanish.

In May 2007, St. Stanislaus became the home of the Archdiocese of Milwaukee's Latin Mass community, offering the "missa extraordinaria" (the 1962 missal of John XXIII) weekly on Sundays, at 10:00 AM.  While Mass in Spanish was relocated to neighboring St. Anthony's Church, St. Stanislaus continues to offer the "missa ordinaria" (the 1970 missal of Paul VI) in English each Saturday evening, at 4:00 PM.

In 2008, the church was erected an Oratory of the Institute of Christ the King Sovereign Priest, an order of priests dedicated to the celebration of the Traditional Latin Mass. Canon Olivier Meney of the Institute was appointed the rector of the oratory.

See also
Polish Cathedral style churches
Edward Kozłowski
Hyacinth (Jacek) Gulski

References

Further reading
 Archdiocese of Milwaukee
 The Polish Churches of Milwaukee
 The Immigrant Church
 Milwaukee County Historical Society
 The Polish Churches of Milwaukee

External links
 Institute of Christ the King Sovereign Priest Official Site 

Landmarks in Wisconsin
Roman Catholic churches in Milwaukee
History of Catholicism in the United States
Religious organizations established in 1866
Polish Cathedral style architecture
Churches used by the Institute of Christ the King Sovereign Priest
Polish-American culture in Milwaukee
1866 establishments in Wisconsin